A Headquarters and Headquarters Squadron, abbreviated as HHS or HQHQSQDN, is the headquarters entity for a United States Marine Corps aviation facility.

Organization
A H&HS usually consists of the headquarters group (the station commanding general or officer), the squadron headquarters (commanding officer and his staff), public affairs and journalism, facilities planning & maintenance, a motor pool, air traffic control, meteorology, fuels, ordnance, other aviation support, Aircraft Rescue and Firefighting, a Provost Marshal, the Station Judge Advocate's Office, some sort of United States Navy medical facility, and Marine Corps Community Services, which usually host services like a post exchange, a commissary, gas stations, barber shops, library, movie theater, family services, Single Marine Program, and the like.

List of H&HSs

See also

 List of United States Marine Corps installations
 United States Marine Corps aviation
 List of active United States Marine Corps aircraft squadrons
 List of inactive United States Marine Corps aircraft squadrons
 List of United States Marine Corps aviation support units

Citations

References

United States Marine Corps aviation support squadrons